The bigmouth skate (Amblyraja robertsi) is a species of fish in the family Rajidae. It lives near the bottom in deep waters in Southeast Atlantic in depths below 1000 m. Its maximum size is 77 cm. It has a hard, roughly triangular snout and smooth body with star-based thorns around its eyes, tail, and elsewhere. Its top side is dark gray and underside has white spots. As the name suggests, it has a large mouth.

References
 http://www.biodiversityexplorer.org/chondrichthyes/elasmobranchii/batoidei/amblyraja_robertsi.htm
 http://www.discoverlife.org/mp/20o?search=Amblyraja+robertsi

External links
 Species Description of Amblyraja robertsi at biodiversityexplorer.org
 Species Description of Amblyraja robertsi at www.shark-references.com

Rajiformes
Taxa named by P. Alexander Hulley
Fish described in 1906